The Principality of Dukagjini refers to the domains (zotërimet) of the Albanian Dukagjini family in northern Albania and wester part of the modern-day territory of Kosovo in the 14th century and 15th century. At their maximum extent, the domains of the Dukagjini extended from Upper Zadrima in the northwest to the Plain of Dukagjini in western Kosovo. The political center of the Dukagjini family was Lezhë until 1393 when it was surrendered to Venice in order to not fall under the Ottomans. The Ottoman sanjak of Dukagjin was named after the rule of the family in the areas that formed it.

The Dukagjini family appears for the first time in historical record in 1281, when their progenitor Gjin Tanushi took the title of dux. They may have been descendants of the earlier Progoni family which roughly claimed the same territory as they.
The Dukagjini formed their independent domains when they rebelled against the Balšić noble family. This event must have happened by 1387, because that year the brothers Pal and Lekë Dukagjini signed a trade agreement with the Republic of Ragusa and allowed free passage to the republic's merchants through their territories. It was later ruled by Pal's descendants, Tanush Dukagjini, and Pal Dukagjini II. In June 1393, the two Dukagjini brothers ceded it to Venice, which it kept until 1478 - despite later attempts by the family to retake the city. The difficult to access mountainous hinterland in the east remained under the control of the Dukagjini. In 1398, Little Tanush (son of Pal I), surrendered to the Ottomans, but in 1402, after their defeat at Ankara and the capture of Sultan Bayezid I, he freed himself from them.

The main representatives of the Dukagjini in the 15th century were Pal II with his sons Lekë III. and Nikollë II. Dukagjini († 1454). Pal Dukagjini and his son Nikollë participated in Skanderbeg's assembly of Lezha on March 2, 1444, as vassals of Lekë Zaharia, the lord of Sati and Danja. Lekë III. apologized for not being able to attend the meeting. After the death of Pal II (1446) Lekë took over the Dukagjini and Nikollë took part in the Albanian-Venetian War (1447–1448).

References

Bibliography 

Albanian principalities
Medieval Albanian nobility
Former countries in the Balkans
Former monarchies